WDRF-LD, virtual and UHF digital channel 21, was a low-powered television station licensed to Augusta, Georgia, United States. The station is owned by HC2 Holdings. The station doesn't carry any programs at this time.

History 
The station's construction permit was issued on October 17, 2013 under the calls of W21DR-D and changed to the current callsign of WDRF-LD. The license was later on cancelled in 2020.

References

External links

Low-power television stations in the United States
Innovate Corp.
Television stations in Georgia (U.S. state)